Menasha High School is a public high school located in Menasha, Wisconsin, formally organized in 1875.

Athletics 
Menasha's athletic teams are known as the Blue Jays, and compete in the Bay Conference. For many years, they held a football rivalry with nearby Neenah High School, first playing in 1896.

In 2014, Menasha won their first WIAA Division 2 Football Championship by a score of 37–17 against Waukesha West. Their football program is currently Division 3.

Menasha's hockey program is split among two different collaborations with different high schools in the area, with the boys' collaboration being with Neenah, Hortonville, and Shiocton called the NHM Rockets. NHM participate in the Badgerland Conference and took 2nd place in the WIAA 2019 State Championship. The girls' collaboration is with the Fox Cities Stars, a program consisting of 17 high schools in the area. They won back-to-back WIAA Championships in 2019 and 2020.

History 

The current Menasha High School was built between 1936 and 1938. It was completed in 1938 in a Colonial Revival style following the design by the Green Bay firm of Foeller, Schober, and Berners.

In 2014, at a cost of 30 million dollars, the outdated, undersized, and inflexible circa 1930s building went under renovation and expansion. The Architect/Engineer of that project was Eppstein Uhen Architects. Great care was taken to preserve the historical features of the building.

Menasha High School previously occupied two other buildings. The first, built in 1871, was razed in 1896 to expand. The second building was built in 1896 and was completely destroyed by a fire on March 21, 1936.

Notable alumni 
 James C. Kerwin, Justice of the Wisconsin Supreme Court (1905–1921)
 Eric Hinske, Former MLB player
 Jean Kraft, American operatic mezzo-soprano

References 

Public high schools in Wisconsin
Outagamie County, Wisconsin